ʻAbd al-Sattār (ALA-LC romanization of ) is an Arabic Muslim male given name, built on the Arabic words ʻabd and al-Sattār. The name means "servant of the Veiler (of sins)".

Because the letter s is a sun letter, the letter l of the al- is usually assimilated to it. Thus although the name is written with letters corresponding to Abd al-Sattar, the usual pronunciation corresponds to Abd as-Sattar. Alternative transliterations include Abdus Sattar, Abd al-Sattar and others, all subject to variant spacing and hyphenation.

It may refer to:
 Abd al-Sattar Qasim
Abdus Sattar (president) (1906–1985), Bangladeshi jurist and politician who served as president of Bangladesh, November 1981 to March 1982
Maulana Abdul Sattar Khan Niazi (1915–2001), Pakistani religious and political leader
Abdus Sattar (Murshidabad politician) (1925-1991), Indian National Congress politician
Mohammad Abdus Sattar (1925–2011), Indian footballer
Abdul Sattar Edhi (1928-2016), Pakistani philanthropist
Abdul Sattar Afghani (1930–2006), Pakistani politician
Abdul Satar Sirat (born 1937), Afghan politician
Abdus Suttar Khan (1941–2008), Bangladeshi aerospace researcher
Abdul Sattar Jawad (born 1943), Iraqi-American professor of English
Ibrahim Ahmad Abd al-Sattar Muhammad (1956–2010), chief of staff of the Iraqi armed forces before the 2003 invasion
Abdul Sattar Abu Risha (1972–2007), Iraqi Sunni tribal leader and ally of the U.S.
Abdel Sattar Sabry (born 1974), Egyptian footballer
Abdul Sattar (Guantanamo detainee 10) (born 1981), Pakistani prisoner in Guantanamo
Abdul Sattar Bhagat (active 1970), Pakistani cricketer
Abdul Sattar (diplomat) (1931-2019), Foreign Minister of Pakistan 1993 and 1999–2002
Abdus Sattar (West Bengal politician), Communist Party of India (Marxist) 21st century politician
Zuhayr Talib Abd al-Sattar al-Naqib, director of military intelligence in Iraq before the 2003 invasion
Abdel-Sattar Abdel-Jabbar, Iraqi political activist in 2004
Abdussattar Shaikh, FBI informant 1994–2003
Abdul-Satar al-Bahadli (fl. 2004), Iraqi Shi'a cleric
Abdul Sattar Murad (b. 1958), Afghan politician, governor of Kapisa province 2004–07
Abdul Sattar Khan (politician) (b. 1975), a Pakistani politician
Abdus Sattar (politician), a Bangladeshi politician and former member of parliament from Tangail-1.
Abdul Sattar Abdul Nabi, a Maharashtra politician representing Sillod constituency

References

Arabic masculine given names